Tivoli may refer to:

 Tivoli, Lazio, a town in Lazio, Italy, known for historic sites; the inspiration for other places named Tivoli

Buildings
 Tivoli (Baltimore, Maryland), a mansion built about 1855
 Tivoli Building (Cheyenne, Wyoming), a historic downtown building
 Tivoli Hotel in Pirie Street, Adelaide, South Australia 
 Villa d'Este, a 16th-century villa in Tivoli, near Rome, famous for gardens and fountains

Entertainment venues
For all venues with Theatre in the name, see Tivoli Theatre (disambiguation)

Music
 Tivoli (Utrecht), music venue in Utrecht, the Netherlands

Sports
 Hala Tivoli hall, a sporting hall in Ljubljana, Slovenia
 New Tivoli, the stadium of Aachen's best-known football team, Alemannia Aachen, Germany
 Old Tivoli, the former stadium of Aachen's best-known football team, Alemannia Aachen, Germany
 Tivoli-Neu in Innsbruck, Austria
 Tivoli (Innsbruck) in Innsbruck, Austria
 Tivoli End, A stand at the Millmoor stadium in Rotherham, England

Other
 The Tivoli circuit, vaudeville venues in Australia (historic)
 Tivoli Club, 19th century Denver, Colorado gambling saloon owned by infamous badman Soapy Smith
 The Tivoli Bowl, Downers Grove, Illinois, bowling alley and bar

Gardens, parks, and preserves
 Gardens of the Villa d'Este, a 16th-century villa in Tivoli, near Rome
 Jardin de Tivoli, Paris, a garden and park open between 1766 and 1842, built to resemble the gardens of the Villa d'Este in Tivoli, Italy
 Tivoli City Park, a garden and a park in Ljubljana, Slovenia
 Tivoli Friheden, an amusement park in Aarhus, Denmark
 Tivoli Gardens, an amusement park in Copenhagen
 Tivoli Japan, a Japanese version of the Copenhagen park, in Kurashiki, Okayama (closed 2008)
 Tivoli World, amusement park in Costa del Sol, Spain
 Tivoli Nature Preserve, a municipal nature preserve in Albany, New York

Places

Towns
 Tivoli, Lazio, a town and commune in central Italy
 Tivoli, New York, a village in Dutchess County, New York State, United States
 Tivoli, Texas, a small town in the United States
 Tivoli, Grenada, a town in the north east of the island of Grenada
 Tivoli, Cork, a suburb of Cork, Ireland
 Tivoli, Queensland, a suburb of Ipswich in Queensland, Australia
 Tivoli, Karnataka, a village in India

Neighborhoods and housing
 Tivoli, a neighborhood in Innsbruck, Austria
 Tivoli, a neighborhood in Eindhoven, The Netherlands (previously an estate in the same location)
 Tivoli, a residential area to the south of the centre of Cheltenham, England
 Tivoli Garden, a public housing estate on Tsing Yi Island, Hong Kong
 Tivoli Gardens, Kingston, a community in West Kingston, Jamaica

Other geographical entities
 Tivoli River, a river in Bryan County, Georgia, United States
 Tivoli Pond, an 1880 pond in Tivoli City Park in Ljubljana, Slovenia

People 

 Lionel Tivoli (born 1988), French politician

Other uses
 SsangYong Tivoli, a subcompact crossover SUV
 Tívoli (film), a 1974 Mexican comedy-drama film
 Tivoli (musical), a 2001 Australian dance musical set in the Tivoli circuit
 Tivoli Audio, an audio equipment manufacturer and reseller
 Tivoli Brewing Company, a 20th-century Denver, Colorado, brewery located in Lower Downtown Denver
 Tivoli Gardens F.C., a Jamaican football team from Tivoli Gardens, Kingston
 Tivoli Software, a division and brand of IBM, known for infrastructure and service management controls and tools
 Tivoli, Giardino Di Scarlatti, original title of Sonate di Scarlatti, a ballet by Peter Martins